Nikolo Kotzev's Nostradamus is a rock opera in three acts written by Nikolo Kotzev about the life and times of Nostradamus. It was released in a 2-CD set in 2001; it has been performed live for the first time in Sofia, Bulgaria, on November 18th and 19th, 2016. Several members of Kotzev's main project, Brazen Abbot, also appear on this album.

Track listing

CD one
"Overture" (Instrumental)  – 2:58
"Pieces of a Dream"  – 5:41
"Desecration"  – 5:39
"Introduction" – 4:47 See below
"Home Again" (Instrumental) – 1:29 See below
"Henriette"  – 5:11
"Caught Up in a Rush"  – 4:50
"The Eagle"  – 5:19
"Plague"  – 5:49
"Inquisition"  – 5:03
"The King Will Die"  – 4:33
"I Don't Believe"  – 4:32
"Try to Live Again"  – 3:58

CD two
"War of Religions"  – 3:09
"The Inquisitor's Rage"  – 2:48
"Chosen Man"  – 6:21
"World War II"  – 5:39
"World War III"  – 5:14
"Because of You"  – 6:05
"The End of the World"  – 5:34
"I'll Remember You"  – 6:36

All songs were written by Nikolo Kotzev.

Personnel
Nikolo Kotzev - production, mixing, composition

Singers/Cast
Joe Lynn Turner - Nostradamus
Alannah Myles - Anne Gemelle
Sass Jordan - Queen Catherine of France
Glenn Hughes - King Henri II of France
Göran Edman - Soldier/Ghost
Jørn Lande - Inquisitor
Doogie White - Storyteller

Musicians
Nikolo Kotzev - Guitars, Violin
Mic Michaeli - Organ
John Levén - Bass
Ian Haugland - Drums
The Sofia Strings Symphonic Orchestra conducted by Nelko Kolarov

Notes
On the initial pressing of the CD, the tracks "Introduction" and "Home Again" were accidentally switched. While the mistake was corrected on later pressings, the mishap has resulted in some confusion, particularly as most of the promo versions sent to the media are from this initial pressing. The track list above is the correct track list.

External links
 Nikolo Kotzev's Nostradamus Official Website

2001 albums
Concept albums
Rock operas
Cultural depictions of Nostradamus